Gråborg is the ruin of a castle in Öland, Sweden. It is located in Algutsrum parish in Mörbylånga Municipality. The oldest parts of the ancient castle are probably from the 5th century. The castle was expanded in stages into the 12th century. During the Middle Ages, Gråborg was probably utilized as  a protected marketplace.

See also
List of castles in Sweden

References

Castles in Kalmar County
Öland